Kowi Chandra (Chinese: 張國衛) (born 7 March 1986 in Palembang, South Sumatra, Indonesia) is a former Indonesian badminton player who specialized in men's doubles, now representing the United States.

Career
Kowi Chandra was ranked no. 1 in the country in 2003, and he was a former Indonesia National team, which is rated among the best in the world. He move to the United States to continue his badminton career in 2006. He won the U.S. National Badminton Championships in 2008, has excelled at Wilson MIT Boston Badminton Open  in both the Men's Doubles event and the Mixed Doubles event, especially in the latter category in which he has been Champion for an unprecedented three (3) consecutive years (2007, 2008, and 2009). In the thirteen years that the tournament has been taking place, no other doubles team has managed this feat. was ranked number #1 in the United States for mixed doubles in 2009.

In 2010, Chandra was the head coach at from Bay Badminton Club (BBC), one of the largest badminton clubs in the Bay Area. He marked a record in 2011 when ten of his players who enrolled in his training at Bay Badminton in Milpitas were qualified to compete in the Pan American Junior Championships in Kingston, Jamaica. During the same year. In 2012 he was awarded as High-Performer Certified Coach by USA Badminton Organization. Later in 2012, he made his way back to compete in a few tournaments. He attained the first position for Men's Doubles with the former World Champion, Halim Haryanto in U.S. National Badminton Championships 2012, as well as the third position for mixed doubles while pairing with one of his students, Lisa Chang.

Chandra was the recipient of the 2013 USAB Development Coach of The Year. Chandra is a member of the Coaching Advisory Group, leading a critical role in the development of badminton in the US. In 2015, Chandra led Team USA for the World University Games and  Pan American Junior Championships. During Pan Am Junior Championships, the team won the 1st place title (Gold Medal). Later this year, Chandra will also lead for the BWF World Junior Championships.

Achievements

References

External links 
USA Badminton
Bay Badminton Center
KC Badminton
Tournamentsoftware
 Kowi Chandra on Facebook
 KC Badminton on Facebook 

American male badminton players
Indonesian people of Chinese descent
Indonesian male badminton players
1986 births
Living people
People from Palembang